Cumbadan Rumbaya is a 1960 Turkish film based on a 1936 novel by Peyami Safa. It was directed and written by Turgut Demirağ with screenwriter Server Bedii, and stars Çolpan İlhan and Vahi Öz. The film was remade in 2005 as a three episode TV Mini-Series starring Halit Akçatepe and Selda Alkor.

Cast

 Çolpan İlhan 		
 Efgan Efekan 		
 Vahi Öz 		
 Kadriye Tuna 		
 Mürüvet Sim 		
 Sadri Alisik 		
 Faik Coskun 			
 Mahmut Erki 	 		
 Renan Fosforoglu 	 		
 Ziya Keskiner 		
 Adile Nasit 	
 Eyüp Sabri 			
 Mualla Sürer  		
 Cevat Taysi 		
 Tacettin Uygun

References

1960 films
Turkish drama films